August Jam was an outdoor concert held on Saturday, August 10, 1974, at the Charlotte Motor Speedway outside of Charlotte, North Carolina, in the United States. The concert promoter was Kaleidoscope Productions and it was sponsored by radio stations WAYS and WROQ.  The concert featured The Allman Brothers Band, Emerson, Lake & Palmer, Foghat, Black Oak Arkansas, The Marshall Tucker Band, The Ozark Mountain Daredevils, PFM, Grinderswitch, and others. The Eagles were booked to play, but canceled. It was the largest concert ever held in the state of North Carolina and one of the largest in the U.S. at that time, with an estimated attendance in excess of 300,000.

History
The November 1974 issue of Circus magazine had this to say about Emerson, Lake & Palmer's performance:

 
There was a limited number of tickets sold prior to the concert, and when many thousands of additional fans showed up on the day of the performances, those thousands proceeded to crash the fences and rush to the infield. Many of the facilities were overwhelmed due to the crowds, and the weather did not cooperate either, producing a sporadic rain that drenched the concert goers, and turned the infield into a muddy quagmire. However, the music went on as scheduled.

See also

 List of historic rock festivals
 List of jam band music festivals

References

External links

 Scan of Newspaper Ad for Concert
 Scan of backstage pass
 Detroit Metro Times Review of Black Oak Arkansas DVD featuring August Jam performance
 Photos of ELP, Allman Brothers, BOA, Foghat, Wolfman Jack, the crowd and others
 

Music festivals established in 1974
Jam band festivals
1974 in the United States
Concerts in the United States
Rock festivals in the United States
Music festivals in North Carolina
August 1974 events in the United States